Artificial Studios was a computer game development and engine development company founded in 2001.

Artificial Studios first came to attention with their "Reality Engine", unveiled in 2004, a solution for games using next-generation DirectX9-powered graphics.
This is one of several "next-gen" engines, see Game Engines.

All of the Reality Engine intellectual property was purchased by Epic Games in 2005 and Artificial Studios co-founder and lead engine programmer, Tim Johnson, was also hired by Epic as part of the deal. All development on Reality Engine has ceased and all Reality Engine licensees are encouraged to upgrade to Unreal Engine 3.

In 2006, Artificial Studios released CellFactor: Combat Training, then CellFactor: Revolution, a free downloadable game (of which a demo was released in May 2006) designed to show off the capabilities of the AGEIA PhysX game physics acceleration chipset. The game used Artificial Studio's own 'Reality Engine' technology. The full game was released for free on May 8, 2007, and can be downloaded from a variety of gaming websites.

In 2007, Artificial Studios released Monster Madness: Battle For Suburbia, published by SouthPeak Games for the Xbox 360 and PC as their flagship title. The Monster Madness franchise was continued in 2008, by new developers, with Monster Madness: Grave Danger.

In 2008, Artificial Studios acquired funding for their unannounced title, codename "R6", from publisher Ignition Entertainment. A new studio was established, Ignition Entertainment: Florida, for development of this project. The studio had approximately 70 employees and the title was rumored for a "late 2009" release. The project was cancelled in 2010 and the studio was abruptly closed.

References

External links 
 Artificial Studios official site 
 Xbox.com - Monster Madness: Battle for Suburbia
 Cell Factor: Revolution
 Cell Factor: Combat Training

Companies established in 2001
Video game development companies
Video game companies of the United States